Dragon Quest Characters: Torneko no Daibōken 3 – Fushigi no Dungeon is the third game in the Torneko series released in 2002. It is part of the Mystery Dungeon series and contains randomly generated dungeons and uses turn-based action combat. It is the third Dragon Quest spin-off game in the Mystery Dungeon series. The game was also made for the Game Boy Advance in 2004.

Gameplay
The main character of the game is Torneko, originally localized as Taloon in North America, a merchant and playable character from Dragon Quest IV. Torneko can explore fully 3D dungeons and have members join his party. The player moves through randomly generated dungeons and uses turn-based action combat. The player can bring along creatures and henchmen to fight with them as they battle monsters in the dungeons. In the Game Boy Advance version, an addition mode is available in which the player can fight through four advanced dungeons independently of the game's story.

The game is the first in the series to feature 3D graphics, and includes multiple towns, villages, castles, and dungeons. Some of the locations are not randomly generated. The game includes over 170 types of monsters, and a larger number of items and spells to use in combat than previous Torneko games.

Story
The plot for Torneko no Daibōken 3 happens seven years after the events of Torneko no Daibōken: Fushigi no Dungeon and six and a half year after Torneko: The Last Hope. In the game, Torneko and his wife Nene and son Poporo journey to a distant island for a vacation for celebrating Poporo's twelfth anniversary. During that time, an unexpected trouble occurred and the Torneko family arrived at a strange island. While there, mysterious forces attack and Torneko must journey into dungeons to fight them off.

Release
Torneko no Daibōken 3 would be released exclusively in Japan by Enix on PlayStation 2, on October 31, 2002. Its Game Boy Advance port, Torneko no Daibōken 3 Advance, would also be released exclusively in Japan by Square Enix on June 24, 2004.

An English fan translations of Torneko no Daibōken 3 Advance would later be published on March 6, 2021, as a public beta test. The game was translated by Sam Steel.

Reception

The PlayStation 2 version of the game has sold over 513,000 copies as of November 2008. The Game Boy Advance version of the game has sold nearly 117,000 copies as of 2007. The PlayStation 2 version was given a high 35 out of 40 by Famitsu magazine. The Game Boy Advance version was given a lower 32 out of 40.

Notes

References

External links 
 Spike Chunsoft's  for the PlayStation 2 version .
 Square Enix's  for the Game Boy Advance version .

Role-playing video games
Chunsoft games
Japan-exclusive video games
Game Boy Advance games
PlayStation 2 games
Video game prequels
Matrix Software games
2002 video games
Video games developed in Japan
Video games scored by Koichi Sugiyama
Mystery Dungeon
Roguelike video games
Single-player video games
Torneko no Daibōken 3